Empire of the Sun is an Australian electronic music duo formed in 2007. The duo is a collaboration between Luke Steele, of alternative rock band The Sleepy Jackson, and Nick Littlemore, of electronic dance band Pnau.

Empire of the Sun's 2008 debut album, Walking on a Dream, brought the duo international success and has been certified double platinum in Australia and gold in the United Kingdom. The album provided a number of internationally charting singles including "Walking on a Dream", which peaked at number ten on the Australian ARIA Singles Chart and reached number sixty four on the UK Singles Chart, and "We Are the People", which peaked at number fourteen on the UK Singles Chart. The band's second album, Ice on the Dune, was released in June 2013, preceded by lead single "Alive" on 16 April. The band are signed to EMI Music Australia/Virgin. As a live band, they have performed internationally and are known for their flamboyant appearance and elaborate stage sets.

The duo have won a number of Australian music awards, with Walking on a Dream receiving 11 nominations at the ARIA Music Awards of 2009, winning seven, including Album of the Year.

History

2000–2007: Formation
Luke Steele and Nick Littlemore met in 2000 after being introduced by Steele's A&R executive, Simon Moor, in a bar in Sydney. Both were at the time signed to EMI and had already been working on different projects. Over the years that followed, the two collaborated on a number of occasions. Littlemore helped write the song "Tell the Girls That I'm Not Hangin' Out", which appeared on The Sleepy Jackson's 2003 debut album, Lovers, and Steele had some artistic input in Littlemore's 2006 art-rock project Teenager. After a falling out over the song on Lovers the co-operation ceased for a while, with Littlemore commenting "I'm a very intense person and I take things to heart".

The two reconvened in 2006 to work on two songs for the Pnau album that was released in late 2007. They collaborated on the tracks "Freedom" and the opener "With You Forever" where Steele supplied the vocal. This prompted a change in direction for the band who began to craft a work more vocally-centered album featuring guest performances. A track-by-track analysis of the album Pnau revealed that writing of "With You Forever" with Luke Steele inspired Littlemore's band to begin work on a collaborative project. Littlemore said, "We fell in love with music again with [With You Forever]; I think this is [Pnau's] first great song." The release of Pnau brought an interest from Elton John, who signed Littlemore to his management company.

The new project began to develop under the working title of "Steelemore" as a collaboration between Steele and Littlemore, with Pnau partner Peter Mayes listed as a producer and occasional co-writer. As Steele was living in Perth and Littlemore was in Sydney the two spent time writing songs separately while meeting occasionally in Sydney to decide on the musical direction and style. When they had accumulated enough material Mayes and duo began to record the album throughout 2007 with the assistance of Jonathan Sloan.

2007–2012: Walking on a Dream
While the record had been largely recorded and mixed throughout 2007, the self-titled Pnau album took precedence for Littlemore and Mayes in the first half of 2008. The duo put out the title-track "Walking on a Dream" in anticipation of the album's release. It appeared in digital format on 30 August 2008, and received airtime on Australian radio and reached number ten on the Australian ARIA Singles Chart. A second single, titled "We Are the People", was released on 30 September and peaked at number twenty-four in Australia. The album Walking on a Dream appeared on 3 October 2008 and debuted at number eight on the ARIA Albums Charts, peaking at number six. The duo embarked on an international promotional tour in support of the album that was released in Europe in February/March 2009 followed by a North American release in April of the same year. While the project had initially been conceived as studio-only, the growing success brought "an audience [to which] we felt a duty to be good to them". Upon their return to Australia Steele began to prepare for a live debut of the band at Parklife Festival in September and October 2009. The headlined three shows, described as a visual "overload [where] giant graphics swam and spun over the stage as costumed dancers writhed to the beat and Steele on a pedestal onstage, [wearing] a gigantic metallic headpiece and his usual 'Ming The Merciless' robe". A third single, "Standing on the Shore" was released in June 2009 however promotion was scaled back when Steele suffered from exhaustion. A remixed version "Without You" was released as the album's fourth single the following September.Littlemore decided to opt out of performing with the band live, citing 'I’ve always felt that once you make a record it's not yours anymore'. Steele gave the impression that his partner left the band in September 2009, however, Littlemore resurfaced in the following month, citing his production work and a project with Cirque du Soleil as the reason for the lack of communication. He divided his time between the UK and Montreal while working on other creative commitments. Steele continued to perform live with the band at a number of Australian outdoor events. Towards the end of 2009, the band received a number of ARIA Awards for Walking on a Dream, including Best Album of the Year.

The band performed as a co-headliner at the touring Future Music Festival around Australia in February/March 2010. The band made their international debut at the Vive Latino Festival in Mexico City in April of that same year. They moved to Europe for the summer festival season where they performed at among others Glastonbury and Rock Werchter. The band made their American debut at the Lollapalooza festival. In October 2010, "We Are the People" was used as the soundtrack for a Vodafone TV commercial in Germany and subsequently topped the German Singles Chart. In November 2010, Littlemore indicated that he had "talked to Luke (Steele) the other day; we're doing a new record. We've already written a couple of tunes. You know when it's right I guess". In July 2011, Littlemore announced that the band had gone into the studio at the end of June to begin working on a second Empire of the Sun album while he confirmed would "come on board this time, actually come together and tour". As recording continued, Littlemore continued to have Pnau related commitments, releasing the album Soft Universe in 2011 and the Elton John remix album Good Morning to the Night in 2012.

2012–2016: Ice on the Dune
For much of 2012, the duo and their collaborators spent time recording material while Steele and the band retired from touring. On 11 March 2013, the band revealed a trailer for their second album entitled Ice on the Dune directed by J. D. Dillard and confirmed the release date as June 2013. The lead single "Alive" was released on 16 April and on the same day, the album was made available for pre-order on iTunes. The single had moderate success in Australia and Europe. On 18 April 2013, the Farrelly brothers announced that the band would score Dumb and Dumber To. Ice on the Dune was released on 14 June 2013 in Australia and New Zealand. Steele would later describe the lack of success of the album as part of their progression as a band.

Steele received global media attention following an interview he completed with music publication NME in August 2013 at the Sziget Festival in Budapest. During the interview, Steele compared Ice on the Dune with Daft Punk's 2013 album release Random Access Memories, stating: "They had a great marketing campaign, but we’ve got better songs." In 2014 the band performed at the Coachella Festival, headlining the Sahara Tent.

"Alive" was used in the introduction video for Google I/O 2013. It was also played within the introduction video of the new Yahoo! logo on 5 September 2013, played over the end credits of the 2013 film Paranoia, and featured in the movie Dumb and Dumber To. "Alive" was also a featured song on the soundtrack of EA Sports game, FIFA 14.

In December 2014, Empire of the Sun released two songs, "Tonight" and "Wandering Star", which were written for the Farrelly brothers film, Dumb and Dumber To. For much of 2015, the duo were writing and recording of their third album in Hawaii and Los Angeles. By the end of the year, Steele noted that the new release was "75 percent there".

The band continued to perform live in the second half of 2015, including a show at the Hollywood Bowl.

In January 2016, the band's 2008 album title track "Walking on a Dream" was featured in a national commercial titled "The Dreamer" in the United States for the Japanese automaker Honda to promote the 2016 Honda Civic. The song finally led to the US chart breakthrough for the band, peaking at number 3 on Billboards Alternative music charts, topping the dance music charts, and peaking at number 40 on the Mainstream Top 40 chart.

2016–2017: Two Vines
In August 2016, it was announced that the third album Two Vines was set for release on 28 October 2016. The album was co-produced by Peter Mayes and features contributions by Lindsey Buckingham, Wendy Melvoin, and former David Bowie collaborators Henry Hey and Tim Lefebvre. The 15-track album includes a remix of the song "Walking on a Dream" and was partly recorded in Hawaii. Littlemore explained the inspiration behind the title as "this image of a modern city overtaken by jungle". The first single "High and Low" was released on 24 August. "High and Low" was also featured in the EA Sports game, FIFA 17.

In an interview with Billboard in August 2017, Steele announced that he and Littlemore had recently started working on their fourth album in Japan, and that a music video for "Way to Go" was also shot in Japan. He spoke of how he loves Japanese music, and that a koto player came in for a day.

In September 2017, DS Automobiles released a video featuring a new exclusive Empire song, "On Our Way Home", starring the Ukrainian actress and model Alina Kovalenko.

2021-present 
In a podcast interview with The Plug with Neil Griffiths on October 6, 2021, Littlemore said that the band had been struggling to write new music remotely over Zoom during the COVID-19 pandemic, and assured fans that new music was being composed.  

In February 2022, Luke Steele announced a debut solo studio album, Listen to the Water and released its lead single, "Common Man", on 11 February 2022.

Name 
Although the name of the project has been attributed to the 1984 novel of the same name by J. G. Ballard, Littlemore denied this and offers an explanation, saying, "the name comes more from the idea of ... the fact that we're traveling around the world going to all the places of empires of the civilization where the sun has been a theme of worship. It's not based on the Ballard novel nor the Spielberg film of the same name."

Style 
The band employs elaborate stage sets and headdress (such as wearing kabuto, war bonnets and war paint), which reflects the duo's background in visual art. Littlemore explained that "we did see Alejandro Jodorowsky's Holy Mountain and it influenced the way we could think about visualization". The band has worked with a number of designers, including Jessica Huerta. Steele described the inspiration for the visual aspect as "the vision of this band, it's built on imagination, so it comes from studying the samurais in art school to digital graphics, to topography, to filming under the ocean, to oil paintings, anything really."

Discography

Studio albums

Singles

Promotional singles

Other appearances

Remixes

Music videos

Awards and nominations

In the UK, they gained fourth position on the BBC News website's Sound of 2009 poll.

ARIA Awards
The ARIA Music Awards of 2009 nominations were announced on 8 October 2009. Empire of the Sun received the most nominations of any artist, with a total of eleven. The winners were announced on 26 November 2009 with Empire of the Sun winning in seven categories.

The nominations for the ARIA Music Awards of 2010 were announced on 28 September 2010 and the winners were announced on 7 November 2010. The final nominees for the ARIA Music Awards of 2013 were announced on 14 October, as well as the nominees and winners for the Fine Arts Awards and Artisan Awards.

|-
| rowspan="11" | 2009 || rowspan="2" | Walking on a Dream || ARIA Award for Album of the Year ||  
|-
| ARIA Award for Highest Selling Album ||  
|-
| rowspan="2" | "Walking on a Dream" || ARIA Award for Single of the Year ||  
|-
| ARIA Award for Highest Selling Single ||  
|-
| "Walking on a Dream" (directed by Josh Logue of Mathematics) || rowspan="2" | ARIA Award for Best Video||  
|-
| "We Are the People" ||  
|-
| rowspan="2" | Empire of the Sun || ARIA Award for Best Group ||  
|-
| ARIA Award for Best Pop Release ||  
|-
| Empire of the Sun and Donnie Sloan with Peter Mayes || Producer of the Year ||  
|-
| Aaron Hayward and David Homer from Debaser || ARIA Award for Best Cover Art ||  
|-
| Peter Mayes || Engineer of the Year ||  
|-
| rowspan="2" | 2010 || "Half Mast" || Best Pop Release ||  
|-
| Accidents Happen soundtrack – Luke Steele, Empire of the Sun and The Middle East || Best Original Soundtrack/Cast/Show Album (Fine Arts Award) ||  
|-
| rowspan="5" | 2013 || rowspan="2" | Empire of the Sun – Ice on the Dune || Best Group ||  
|-
| Best Pop Release ||  
|-
| Aaron Hayward and David Homer (Debaser) || Best Cover Art ||  
|-
| Peter Mayes || Engineer of the Year ||   
|-
| Luke Steele, Nick Littlemore, Peter Mayes and Jonathan Sloan || Producer of the Year ||

APRA Awards
The APRA Awards are presented annually from 1982 by the Australasian Performing Right Association (APRA).

|-
| rowspan="3" | 2010 || "We Are the People" || Song of the Year || 
|-
| Luke Steele, Jonathan Sloan, Nick Littlemore – Empire of the Sun || Breakthrough Songwriter of the Year || 
|-
| "Walking on a Dream" || Dance Work of the Year || 
|-
| rowspan="2" | 2014 
| rowspan="2" | "Alive" 
| Song of the Year
| 
|-
| Dance Work of the Year
|

International Dance Music Awards

|-
| rowspan=2|2010
| Themselves 
| Best Breakthrough Artist (Group)
| 
|-
| "We Are The People"
| rowspan=2|Best Alternative/Rock Dance Track
| 
|-
| 2014
| "Alive"
|

MTV Europe Music Awards
The MTV Europe Music Awards is an award presented by Viacom International Media Networks to honour artists and music in pop culture. They commenced in 2013.

|-
| 2013
| Themselves
| Best Australian Act
| 
|-

Q Awards
 
|-
| 2009
| Themselves
| Best New Act 
|

World Music Awards

|-
| 2010
| rowspan=3|Themselves 
| World's Best Selling Australian Artist
| 
|-
| rowspan=7|2014
| World's Best Group
| 
|-
| World's Best Live Act
| 
|-
| Ice on the Dune
| World's Best Album
| 
|-
| rowspan=2|"Alive"
| World's Best Song
| 
|-
| rowspan=2|World's Best Video
| 
|-
| rowspan=2|"We are The People"
| 
|-
| World's Best Song 
|

Live performance band members
 Luke Steele – lead vocals, guitars, keyboards (2008–present)
 Nick Littlemore – tour management (2008–present), keyboards, backing vocals (2008–2009)
 Ken Jennings – keyboards (2009–present)
 Ian Ball – guitar (2015–present)
 Olly Peacock – drums (2015–present)
 Alex Berry – bass (2015–present)
 Tony Mitolo – drums (2008–2015) 
 Surahn Sidhu – guitar, bass, backing vocals (2008–2015)

Notes

References

External links

 
2007 establishments in Australia
APRA Award winners
ARIA Award winners
Astralwerks artists
Australian musical duos
Australian new wave musical groups
Australian synthpop groups
Capitol Records artists
Dance-rock musical groups
Electronic music duos
Australian electronic rock musical groups
Electropop groups
Male musical duos
Musical groups established in 2007
Virgin Records artists